Matigramma pulverilinea, the dusty lined matigramma, is an owlet moth in the family Erebidae. The species was first described by Augustus Radcliffe Grote in 1872. It is found in North America.

The MONA or Hodges number for Matigramma pulverilinea is 8679.

References

Further reading

External links

 

Omopterini
Articles created by Qbugbot
Moths described in 1872